Jafnea is a genus of fungi in the family Pyronemataceae. It was circumscribed by mycologist Richard Korf in 1960.

The genus name of Jafnea is in honour of Johan Axel Frithiof Nannfeldt (1904-1985), who was a Swedish botanist and mycologist.

References

Pyronemataceae
Pezizales genera
Taxa named by Richard P. Korf
Taxa described in 1960